Ruth Crawford Seeger's String Quartet (1931) is "regarded as one of the finest modernist works of the genre". The composition is in four untitled movements.

Sources

Crawford-Seeger, Ruth
1931 compositions
Modernist compositions